I'll Be Home for Christmas is the tenth studio album and second Christmas album by American singer Brian McKnight. It was released on October 7, 2008 through Razor & Tie.

Critical reception

In his review for Allmusic, editor Anthony Tognazzini wrote that "one good holiday album deserves another, and McKnight’s smooth, alluring voice sounds better than ever on 2008’s ll Be Home for Christmas. The tunes are a bit more secular than Bethlehem."

Track listing

Charts

References 

Albums produced by Brian McKnight
Brian McKnight albums
2008 Christmas albums
Christmas albums by American artists